Kirk Craig Saarloos (born May 23, 1979) is an American baseball coach and former pitcher, who is the current head baseball coach of the TCU Horned Frogs. He played college baseball at Cal State Fullerton for coach George Horton from 1999 to 2001 and played in Major League Baseball (MLB) for seven seasons from 2002 to 2008. 

The Houston Astros selected Saarloos in the third round of the 2001 Major League Baseball Draft. He played 7 years a pitcher in the MLB, with Houston from 2002 to 2003, the Oakland Athletics 2004 to 2006, Cincinnati Reds in 2007 before returning to Oakland in 2008.

High school and college
Saarloos graduated from Valley Christian High School in Cerritos, California, where he was a three-sport (baseball, football and soccer) athlete. He attended California State University, Fullerton, where he established himself as one of the best closers in college baseball during his sophomore and junior seasons. In 1999, he played collegiate summer baseball with the Cotuit Kettleers of the Cape Cod Baseball League.

In , his senior year, Saarloos became a starting pitcher (the new closer was former Washington Nationals closer Chad Cordero) and established himself as the ace of the staff, winning 15 games with a 2.18 earned run average (ERA). He was drafted by the Houston Astros in the 2001 Major League Baseball Draft in the third round as the 86th overall pick.

Professional career
Saarloos quickly rose in the Astros organization, making brief stops at Double-A Round Rock and Triple-A New Orleans before being called up to the major leagues in his second year as a professional. In , he went 6–7 with a 6.01 ERA with Houston and was sent down to New Orleans for the next season. In , he again pitched very well in the minors but posted a 4.93 ERA in 36 games for the big club. He also contributed to the Astros' six-pitcher no-hitter of the New York Yankees on June 11, throwing the last out of the third inning and all of the fourth. It was around this time he caught the eye of Oakland Athletics assistant general manager Paul DePodesta. A few weeks into the  season, after appearing in only two games for New Orleans, he was traded to the Athletics for Chad Harville. They sent him to Triple-A Sacramento, where he pitched well enough to receive a call-up and start five games for Oakland.

In , with Mark Mulder and Tim Hudson traded away, the Athletics had openings in their rotation. Saarloos beat out Keiichi Yabu and Juan Cruz to win the last starter spot in the rotation. Saarloos succeeded, going 10–9 with a 4.17 ERA in 27 starts. He was widely considered to be among the best #5 starters in the American League, sporting one of the lowest home run rates.

With the signing of veteran starter Esteban Loaiza before the  season, the A's bumped Saarloos to the bullpen. Soon after, Rich Harden got injured, and Saarloos was put in as a fifth starter for a few games. He was also used in many varying relief roles, much like Justin Duchscherer was in 2005, but also as a spot starter. Shifting between the bullpen and the rotation, Saarloos finished with a record of 7–7 in 35 games for the A's. He allowed more home runs (19) than the previous season (11). On January 19, Saarloos signed a one-year $1.2 million deal with the Athletics.

On January 23, 2007, Saarloos was traded to the Cincinnati Reds for minor league reliever David Shafer. Both teams also received a player to be named later. On May 28, 2007, Saarloos was sent to the minors after failing to retire any of the seven batters he faced in a 14–10 loss to the Pittsburgh Pirates the night before. In his lone season with the Reds, Saarloos had a 7.17 ERA in 42.2 innings. On October 12, 2007, Saarloos was outrighted to the minor leagues. He refused the assignment and became a free agent.

On January 15, Saarloos signed a minor league contract with an invitation to spring training with the Oakland Athletics. On April 14, he was added to the major league roster but was designated for assignment on April 23. He was sent outright to Triple-A on April 25. On August 18, Saarloos was recalled. He became a free agent at the end of the season.

Saarloos signed a minor league contract with an invitation to spring training with the Cleveland Indians in January ; after training camp, he was sent to Minor League camp on March 24, 2009. He went 3–10 in 16 games at the AAA level. He retired after the 2009 season.

Scouting
Saarloos has a variety of pitches, including a four-seam fastball, a curveball, a slider, and a changeup. However, his best pitch by far is his mid-to-high 80's sinker. For this reason, Saarloos is known predominantly as a sinkerball specialist and as such, gets few strikeouts (batters tend to hit groundballs when faced with a sinker). In fact, his 2.99 strikeouts per nine innings in 2005 ranked third to last in Major League Baseball and was the lowest mark in Oakland Athletics history for a starting pitcher.

Coaching career 
Saarloos was on the 2011 Cal State Fullerton coaching staff as an undergraduate assistant coach. His primary duties were as pitching coach. Opposing teams batted .250 against his pitchers, and he coached Big West Pitcher of the Year Dylan Floro and four Freshmen All-American pitchers. In 2012, Saarloos returned to Cal State Fullerton as their full-time pitching coach and assisted in recruiting. He became the pitching coach at Texas Christian University in the summer of 2012. He led the team to the lowest ERA in school history since 1968.

He was named the head coach at TCU on June 15, 2021. Saarloos led the Horned Frogs to a 38–22 record, a regular season Big 12 Championship,  and an appearance in the College Station regional.

Head coaching record

See also

 Houston Astros award winners and league leaders
 List of Houston Astros no-hitters
 List of Major League Baseball no-hitters
 List of California State University, Fullerton people

References

External links

1979 births
Living people
Cal State Fullerton Titans baseball players
Cal State Fullerton Titans baseball coaches
TCU Horned Frogs baseball coaches
Baseball players from Long Beach, California
Major League Baseball pitchers
Houston Astros players
Oakland Athletics players
Cincinnati Reds players
Sportspeople from Long Beach, California
American people of Dutch descent
Round Rock Express players
New Orleans Zephyrs players
Sacramento River Cats players
Louisville Bats players
Cotuit Kettleers players
Anchorage Bucs players